Homenaje a La Gran Señora (Homage to The Great Lady) is the third studio album released by Spanish singer Natalia Jiménez on December 9, 2016, by Sony Music Latin.

Homenaje a La Gran Señora is a tribute album that consists of twelve cover versions of songs released by the late American singer-songwriter Jenni Rivera, with the album having a mixture of Latin pop and mariachi. The album was produced by Pepe Garza and Edgar Barrera.

Homenaje a La Gran Señora reached number two on the Billboard Top Latin Albums chart in the United States.

Background

American singer-songwriter Jenni Rivera was killed in a plane crash on December 9, 2012, while traveling to Mexico City to film for La Voz... México. The album's release marks four years since Rivera's death. Jiménez told the Associated Press, that her and Rivera were planning to record an album and embark on a tour. She also stated, "Although many of these songs have also been recorded by many other singers, I feel that many of these songs were famous thanks to Jenni." Jimenez told Univision's Despierta América, that she has been wanting to record a mariachi/ranchera album and she wanted to do something with Rivera's music because she liked it a lot. The title of the recording is a reference to Rivera's honorary title "The Great Lady" ("La Gran Señora").

Recordings and covers
The album was produced by Pepe Garza, Edgar Barrera, and Aaron Sterling, who also played the drums. The album covers twelve of Rivera's most recognized works such as, "Ya Lo Sé", "De Contrabando", "Por Qué No Le Calas", "No Llega El Olvido", "Inolvidable", and "Tu Camisa Puesta". "Chuper Amigos" features a duet with her Rivera's brother, Lupillo Rivera, meanwhile "Ovarios", features a duet with Rivera's daughter, Chiquis Rivera. Some songs were originally released by other artists, then released by Rivera and some are written by Rivera herself.

Promotion
On December 1, 2016, Jiménez announced the release of the album on Instagram, posting a teaser of "Ya Lo Sé". Jiménez confirmed to Billboard magazine that she will embark on a tour to promote the album.

Track listing

Personnel
Adapted from the album liner notes.

Aaron Sterling – drums
Rodrigo Cárdena – bass guitar 
Edgar Barrera – bass guitar
Jose Favela – bass guitar
Dan Warner – electric guitar
Edgar Barrera – piano 
Giancarlo Alfanno – piano
Luis Barrera Jr – percussion
Agústin Rocha – accordion
Josué Eduardo López – violin
Adrian Vaca – violin
Fernando Ortiz – trumpet
Sergio Iribe – trumpet
Natalia Jiménez – vocals
Lupillo Rivera – vocals
Chiquis Rivera – vocals

Charts

Weekly charts

Year-end charts

Release history

See also
2016 in Latin music

References

2016 albums
Tribute albums
Natalia Jiménez albums
Sony Music Latin albums
Spanish-language albums